Pomroy Township is the name of some places in the U.S. state of Minnesota:
Pomroy Township, Itasca County, Minnesota
Pomroy Township, Kanabec County, Minnesota

See also

 Pomroy (disambiguation)

Minnesota township disambiguation pages